The Leagues Cup is an annual association football competition between clubs from Major League Soccer and Liga MX in North America. It debuted in July 2019 with four teams participating from each league. The first edition was a single-elimination tournament hosted in the United States with a final played in Las Vegas on September 18, 2019.

In 2023, the tournament was expanded to include all clubs from MLS and Liga MX, and now functions as the regional cup for the North American zone within CONCACAF. The top three Leagues Cup teams qualify for the CONCACAF Champions League with the champion receiving a bye to the Round of 16.

Format

The 2019 edition of Leagues Cup featured four clubs from each league in an eight-team single-elimination knockout tournament, with the first two rounds hosted by the MLS club. The participating MLS teams in the first edition were invitees, but later editions are planned to use league results for qualification; the four Liga MX participants were chosen based on their league results. The quarterfinals were played on July 23–24 and the semifinals were played on August 20. The first final was played on September 18 at Sam Boyd Stadium in Las Vegas, Nevada.

Beginning with the 2023 edition, the Leagues Cup will include all MLS and Liga MX teams—47 teams in total with 77 matches hosted in the United States and Canada. The top 15 teams from each league will be seeded into 15 groups based on their league standings from the previous season, while the remaining teams are drawn based on geographic proximity. The group stage will have three matches in a round-robin format and the top two teams qualify for the knockout stage. Two teams will also receive byes to the knockout stage: the reigning MLS Cup champion and highest-ranked Liga MX champion from either the previous Clausura and Apertura. The knockout stage will be single-elimination on a fixed bracket.

History

Major League Soccer and Liga MX clubs had previously played in the North American SuperLiga, which ran from 2007 to 2010. Both leagues also send clubs to the CONCACAF Champions League, which has been dominated by Mexican clubs, and the Campeones Cup, a single match played between the winners of the MLS Cup and the Campeón de Campeones. The two leagues began planning a bi-national, eight-team competition to complement the Champions League and provide Mexican clubs with matches to replace the Copa Libertadores in their calendar as soon as 2018. MLS and Liga MX announced a new partnership in March 2018 to create the Campeones Cup and explore options for other bi-national competitions between their clubs.

The Leagues Cup tournament was announced on May 29, 2019, featuring eight teams in its inaugural edition to be played during the summer. The announcement of the tournament was panned by soccer critics in the United States, who called it a meaningless friendly and "cash-grab" for American clubs. The MLS Players Association also expressed concerns over the tournament's creation on the basis of schedule congestion during the summertime. Sam Boyd Stadium in Las Vegas was later announced as the host venue for the final and a broadcasting contract for the tournament was awarded to ESPN and TUDN (formerly Univision Deportes Network). This event was also televised on TSN and TVA Sports in Canada and Televisa in Mexico.

In July 2019, MLS and Liga MX announced that the second edition of the Leagues Cup in 2020 would feature 16 teams—eight from each league. The MLS participants would be drawn from the top four teams in each conference that do not qualify for the CONCACAF Champions League; the Liga MX participants would include the 2019 Apertura champion, 2020 Clausura champion, the 2019–20 Copa MX champion, and the next five best-placed teams in the league. The tournament was canceled on May 19, 2020, amid the COVID-19 pandemic. The eight-team format debuted in the 2021 Leagues Cup, which was played in August and September. In the final at Allegiant Stadium in Las Vegas, Mexican club León defeated Seattle Sounders FC, the first American finalist in the competition's history.

On April 14, 2022, MLS and Liga MX announced the 2022 Leagues Cup Showcase, to be held on August 3, 2022, at SoFi Stadium in Inglewood, California. The event will be a doubleheader of matches: LA Galaxy against C.D. Guadalajara and Los Angeles FC against Club América. On June 30, 2022, it was announced that the Leagues Cup Showcase would expand to include three more matches—FC Cincinnati against C.D. Guadalajara at TQL Stadium in Cincinnati, Ohio; Nashville SC against Club América at Geodis Park in Nashville, Tennessee, on September 21; and Real Salt Lake against Atlas F.C. at Rio Tinto Stadium in Sandy, Utah, on September 22. The events will serve as a one-time replacement of the previously-planned 2022 Leagues Cup which will not be held due to fixture congestion from the 2022 FIFA World Cup and other factors.

Starting from the expanded CONCACAF Champions League in 2024, the Leagues Cup will be used as a qualification tournament for teams from North America. Starting in 2023, the Leagues Cup will be contested by all MLS and Liga MX clubs, during a month-long pause in their respective seasons, with three Champions League berths awarded to the finalists and third-place finisher, and the winner qualifying directly to the round of 16.

Trophy

The Leagues Cup trophy was unveiled in September 2019 and consists of a  silver bowl atop a pedestal. A replica trophy will be gifted to the winners following 12 months with the original trophy.

Finals

Performances

By club

See also
 Campeones Cup
 North American SuperLiga

References

 
International club association football competitions in North America
Recurring sporting events established in 2019
Major League Soccer
Liga MX